Peeping Pete is a 1913 American short comedy film featuring Fatty Arbuckle.

Cast
 Phyllis Allen
 Roscoe 'Fatty' Arbuckle as Pete's wife
 Charles Avery
 Peggy Pearce
 Nick Cogley as Sheriff
 Dot Farley
 Mack Sennett as Pete
 Ford Sterling as Neighbor

See also
 List of American films of 1913
 Fatty Arbuckle filmography

External links

 Peeping Pete on YouTube

1913 films
1913 comedy films
1913 short films
American silent short films
American black-and-white films
Films directed by Mack Sennett
Silent American comedy films
American comedy short films
1910s American films